The 2007 Polish Speedway season was the 2007 season of motorcycle speedway in Poland.

Individual

Polish Individual Speedway Championship
The 2007 Individual Speedway Polish Championship final was held on 15 August at Wrocław.

Golden Helmet
The 2007 Golden Golden Helmet organised by the Polish Motor Union (PZM) was the 2007 event for the league's leading riders. The final was held on the 6 June at Bydgoszcz. The meeting was stopped after 16 heats due to wet weather. Grzegorz Walasek was awarded the title because he was leading with 9 points and three race wins.

Junior Championship
 winner - Paweł Hlib

Silver Helmet
 winner - Marcin Jędrzejewski

Bronze Helmet
 winner - Adam Kajoch

Pairs

Polish Pairs Speedway Championship
The 2007 Polish Pairs Speedway Championship was the 2007 edition of the Polish Pairs Speedway Championship. The final was held on 3 June at Lublin.

Team

Team Speedway Polish Championship
The 2007 Team Speedway Polish Championship was the 2007 edition of the Team Polish Championship. Unia Leszno won the gold medal for the second consecutive season.

Ekstraliga

First round

Results

Play-offs

quarter finals
Toruń v Tarnów 107:78
Leszno v Częstochowa 96:87
Rzeszów v Wrocław 93:90

semi finals
Toruń v Wrocław 92:87
Leszno v Rzeszów 99:81

Final
Toruń v Leszno 85:95

Relegation playoffs
Zielona Góra v Ostrów 108:75

'Statistics'

 Source: www.SportoweFakty.pl

1.Liga

Play offs

Semi finals
Rybnik - Gorzów Wlkp. 1-2	
Gdańsk - Ostrów Wlkp. 1-2

final
Ostrów Wlkp. - Gorzów Wlkp. 56-36, 40-49, 41-49

2.Liga

References

Poland Individual
Poland Team
Speedway
2007 in Polish speedway